Nancy Gaymala Yunupingu (1935–2005; also rendered Yunupiŋu) was a senior Yolngu artist and matriarch, who lived in Arnhem Land in the Northern Territory, Australia. She worked at the Buku-Larrnggay Mulka Centre in Yirrkala, where her work is still held, and is known for her graphic art style, bark paintings and printmaking.

Life and family
Yunupingu was born around 1935, the daughter of Mungurrawuy and sister to the musician Galarrwuy, land rights campaigner Mandawuy Yunupingu, artists Gulumbu Yunupingu and Nyapanyapa Yunupingu, and others. Her mother, Bakili, was an artist and elder of the Galpu clan. Gaymala's moiety was Yirritja and her clans Gumatj and Rrakpala. Her homeland was Biranybirany.

She died in 2005.

Artistic practice
Yunupingu's strength was in graphic arts, but she also did bark paintings with ochre, wove, created wooden carvings, and employed the printmaking techniques of etching and screenprinting.

The Wan'kurra, or golden bandicoot, which features prominently in song-cycles in Gumatj ceremonies, was a common motif in her work, often running through scrubland.

Works, exhibitions and recognition

1992 and 1995: two solo exhibitions at the Australian Girls Own Gallery (aGOG) in Canberra

1995: artist-in-residence at  the Faculty of Creative Arts at Wollongong University, and created a series of linocut prints there

1997: work selected for entry in the Fremantle Print Awards in Western Australia

1999: commissioned by Nabalco to produce a picture for a Christmas card

1999: commissioned to paint large murals for the Aboriginal Hostel at Nhulunbuy, the Gove Industrial Supplies building, and for the children's ward at Nhulunbuy Hospital

1999: together with her sister Gulumbu, and Dhuwarrwarr Marika, she was engaged to paint a large film set for the film Yolngu Boy, which were copies of the famous Yirrkala Church Panels created in 1963 by Yolngu elders

2001: Vital Fluids, a multi-artist exhibition also including the work of England Bangala, Banduk Marika, Judy Watson, Naminapu Maymuru-White, Robin White, and Barrupu Yunupingu, at the Helen Maxwell Gallery

2003: Groundswell: An exhibition of Aboriginal art, a multi-artist exhibition at the Helen Maxwell Gallery

December 2021 – April 2022: Bark Ladies: Eleven Artists from Yirrkala, an exhibition from the Buku-Larrnggay Mulka Centre in Yirrkala, held at the National Gallery of Victoria, also featuring the work of Noŋgirrŋa Marawili, Gulumbu Yunupiŋu, Barrupu Yunupiŋu, Dhambit Munuŋgurr, Marrnyula Munuŋgurr, Mulkun Wirrpanda, Naminapu Maymuru-White, and others, including bark paintings and larrakitj (burial poles)

Collections
The National Gallery of Victoria holds Bäru story (1990), painted with earth pigments on the bark of stringybark.

Her work is also held in major collections around Australia, including:
  National Museum of Australia (Aboriginal Arts Board Collection), Canberra
 National Gallery of Australia, Canberra
 National Maritime Museum, Sydney
 Museums Victoria, Melbourne
 Museum and Art Gallery of the Northern Territory, Darwin
 Charles Darwin University, CDU Art Collection, which holds two etchings and four screenprints

References 
 

1930s births
Living people
Artists from Queensland
Australian Aboriginal artists
20th-century Australian women artists
21st-century Australian women artists
21st-century Australian artists
2005 deaths
Artists from the Northern Territory
Yolngu people